Konami Soga (born 9 April 1995) is a Japanese speed skater.

She participated at the 2019 World Single Distances Speed Skating Championships, winning a medal.

References

External links

1995 births
Living people
Japanese female speed skaters
Sportspeople from Tokyo
World Single Distances Speed Skating Championships medalists